Galaate is a 2019 Kannada romantic comedy film directed and written by M. D. Sridhar. The film stars Prajwal Devaraj, Kriti Kharbanda and Nisha Shetty in the lead roles. Shashikumar and Tara are in the supporting roles. The music is composed by Jassie Gift. The film was dubbed into Hindi as Ek Aur Yudh.

Cast
 Prajwal Devaraj as Abhi
 Kriti Kharbanda as Ankitha
 Hardhika Shetty as Shalini
 Shashikumar
 Tara
 Suman Ranganathan
 Shobaraj
Tennis krishna 
Thilak Shekhar

Soundtrack

Reception

Critical response 

BS Srivani from Deccan Herald wrote "Coming from a seasoned and intelligent director, the stretched out climax is a disappointment. This Galaate loses volume pretty quickly. Watch it for Suman and the rest". A critic from The Times of India scored the film at 3 out of 5 stars and wrote "While Prajwal impresses you with his matured performance, Krithi gives life to her role. Shobhraj and Suman make a good screen couple with decent performances. Tilak shines as a villain. Cinematography by AV Krishnakumar is amazing and music by Jassie Gift is good". Srikant Srinivasa from Rediff.com scored the film at 2 out of 5 stars and says "The music is average and Krishna Kumar's camerawork is good. The film raises a few laughs but lacks zing; it may work as pastime for the college-going crowd." A critic from News18 India wrote "In short, 'Galaate' can be described as an ordinary fare because of its weak story and illogical narration".

References

External links

2013 films
2010s Kannada-language films
2013 romantic comedy films
Indian romantic comedy films
Films shot in India
Films set in Bangalore
Films directed by M. D. Sridhar